Bardistopus is a genus of hoverflies containing one species, Bardistopus papuanum. The original description erroneously stated the species was based on two female specimens; they are in fact both males.

Biology
Larvae are found in ant nests.

Distribution
They are endemic to the Solomon Islands.

References

Hoverfly genera
Diptera of Australasia
Monotypic Diptera genera
Endemic fauna of the Solomon Islands